Naleraq, previously known as Partii Naleraq, is a centrist-populist pro-independence political party in Greenland.

History
In January 2014 Hans Enoksen announced that he was forming a new political party after leaving Siumut. In the November 2014 general election the party won three seats, taken by Enoksen, Per Rosing-Petersen (another former Siumut member) and Anthon Frederiksen (a former Association of Candidates member).

In the April 2018 general election, the party increased its vote share and won four seats in parliament.  In May 2018, MP Henrik Fleischer left the party and switched to Siumut.

On 15 February 2021 the party changed its name and logo. In June 2022 Hans Enoksen resigned as party chairman of the party, and was replaced by Pele Broberg.

Election results

Inatsisartut

Folketing

References

External links
Facebook page

Political parties in Greenland
Centrist parties in Denmark
Political parties established in 2014
2014 establishments in Greenland